Richard Diggs may refer to:

 Richard Digges (died 1634), English lawyer and politician
 Richard Diggs (actor) (died 1727), British stage actor